Kalyptodoras bahiensis is the only species in the genus Kalyptodoras of the catfish (order Siluriformes) family Doradidae. This species is endemic to Brazil where it is found in the Paraguaçu River in the northeast and reaches a length of  SL.

References

Doradidae
Catfish of South America
Freshwater fish of Brazil
Endemic fauna of Brazil
Environment of Bahia
Monotypic fish genera
Taxa named by Heraldo Antonio Britski
Taxa named by Júlio César Garavello
Fish described in 1990